Stade René-Gaillard is a multi-use stadium in Niort, France.

It is the home of French Ligue 2 football team Chamois Niortais (Chamois niortais in French) and it has a capacity of 11,352 people. Niort played their first game at the Stade René Gaillard on 3 August 1974.

The record attendance at the stadium is 16,715 for the game between Chamois Niortais and Olympique Marseille in 1988.

References

External links 
 

Chamois Niortais F.C.
Niort
Football venues in France
Sports venues in Deux-Sèvres
Sports venues completed in 1974